The Riotinto railway was a Spanish railway line, predominantly mining-industrial and narrow gauge, operating between 1875 and 1984. In its day, the line became one of the main railroads in the province of Huelva, also having a large fleet of rolling stock and engines.

The railroad was built between 1873 and 1875 by the British Rio Tinto Company Limited (RTC), that sought to provide maritime access to the minerals extracted from ore deposits in the Riotinto-Nerva mining basin. For much of its route, the track ran parallel to the course of the Tinto River, although in its last stage it ran alongside the Seville-Huelva railroad of Iberian-gauge. For over a century, it was one of the mining railroads in Spain with the most traffic, also becoming one of the main ones due to its characteristics. Likewise, it had a large fleet of cars and engines, to the point of becoming the second largest in the country after the RENFE. The route ceased service in 1984, when it was closed to public traffic.

After several years when the infrastructure was abandoned and subjected to looting, in the late 1980s action was taken to recover the historic railway line in order to restore it back into service. This work would be carried out in the 1990s, a period when the popular Tourist Mining Train was also put into operation. Nowadays, a small railway section, about eleven kilometers long, is kept operational for tourist and recreational purposes. The rest of the route is abandoned or has been dismantled.

History

Origins and construction 
Historically, the territory of the Huelva has been rich in mining deposits of various types, as was the case of the Riotinto mines. During the second half of the 19th century, the exploitation of various deposits in the province passed into foreign hands, mainly British. Parallel to this process, a network of railway lines was built to connect the mines with the coastal ports, such as the Buitrón railway (1870) or the Tharsis railway (1871). The Riotinto basin, rich in pyrites and copper, was of special interest to the house of Rothschild. After a process that lasted years, the Rothschilds finally bought the ownership of the mines from the state in 1873. The acquisition of the mines was accompanied by a state concession to build a railway line to connect them with the port of Huelva and thus allow the transport of the extracted minerals to the coast. The construction of the railroad began in June 1873 by the Rio Tinto Company. The engineer in charge of designing the layout was George Barclay Bruce.

The construction works were carried out in five different sections simultaneously and lasted two years. The most complicated part of the project was between the Riotinto mines and the municipality of Niebla, a section where the route had to run parallel to the course of the Tinto River. In addition to the private land that the RTC acquired to lay the tracks, the State also ceded land in the public domain and authorized compulsory expropriations for reasons of public utility. The Rio Tinto Company Limited reached an agreement with the operating company of the Buitrón railway for the transportation of construction materials, also using the facilities that this company owned in San Juan del Puerto for the unloading of railway material. The slag resulting from the ancient mining works carried out in Roman times was used as track ballast — because it was abundant in the Riotinto basin.

British exploitation 

The Riotinto railway was officially inaugurated on July 28, 1875, and started operations by early August of the same year. Due to the rush of the RTC for its commissioning, the works proceeded swiftly. Construction was completed three months ahead of schedule and also at a budget cost of 767,190 pounds sterling at the time, a figure lower than expected. A year later, a commercial pier began operating in Huelva, built on the waters of the Odiel river. The infrastructure was made of iron and wood, consisting of three floors and with a length of 226 meters.

The route had a track gauge of 1067 millimeters, tuvo una longitud de 83,67 kilómetros and had up to a dozen stations. To the main rail line some branches were added later to link it with the deposits and industrial facilities of the area — in total, a network of almost 360 km was configured. The track started at the company's mining complex and ran parallel to the course of the Tinto River, until it reached the port of Huelva.  In 1896, with the Seville-Huelva track already operational, a junction was built at Las Mallas railway station to carry out transfers between the two lines.

In its early days, rail traffic was irregular, since it depended on whether there were ships docked at the port to load ore. Another problem was the wear and tear suffered by the locomotives on the trips between Riotinto and Huelva, especially on the return trip, due to the steep gradient. Beginning in 1895, the following system was adopted: locomotives based in Huelva would pull the trains to Gadea train station, where engines from Riotinto would take over for the rest of the journey. Dual traction was also adopted, allowing larger convoys to be moved and increasing the load carried. In 1929 the railway moved 1,740,854 tons of ore and 15,369 tons of cargo, a figure that constituted its historical maximum. It is noteworthy that the start of operations of the Riotinto railway allowed the arrival of certain products from the coastal area and the countryside to the mining basin. This meant a cheapening of these goods, which would translate into an improvement in the living standards of the inhabitants of the area.

In 1904, two new branches coming from downtown Riotinto came into service: one that reached Nerva and another that reached Zalamea la Real. Three years earlier, the State had authorized RTC to build the new routes, which sought to provide means of transportation to mine workers living in the towns of Nerva, El Campillo and Zalamea la Real, thus allowing them to continue to travel to and from the mining area. During this time, a total of 85,972 workers and 11,686 individuals (family members), as well as 48 tons of cargo, were transported each month on these branches. However, the operation of the branch lines was financially unprofitable. Between 1883 and 1913, another detour was operational, linking the main line with the facilities of the Peña del Hierro mine.

Throughout its history, the main traffic of the railway consisted in the transport of ore, but the route would eventually be used for passenger traffic after the municipalities in the area requested it. Passenger services began in 1895, going through different stages. Passengers traveled free at first, through a system of passes granted by the company, which caused great unrest among disadvantaged sectors and, after numerous protests, led the RTC to implement a fare system. There were special services, the "workers' trains", which transported technicians and workers from the various towns to their workplaces. These "workers' trains" only ran in the mining area and ran several times a day, both to and from the mine. In addition to occasional trips to Huelva, RTC employees and their families also used the train in summer to travel to the company's beach in Punta Umbría Railway traffic was affected by the strikes of 1913 and 1920, that paralyzed activity in the Riotinto-Nerva mining basin. During the mining strike of 1920 the railway workers began a general strike and the line came to a standstill, with army soldiers arriving in the area having to take charge of its operation.

The growth in traffic experienced by the railway in the early 20th century led the company to introduce a series of modifications to allow dual traction, making it possible for larger convoys to circulate. This increase was up to 35% between 1907 and 1912, so the RTC had to buy new freight cars. There was a project to provide electricity to the general railway in order to save costs, although it was not implemented due to the outbreak of the First World War. However, what was carried out during this period, between 1915 and 1918, was a renewal of the rail track using 65 pounds rails manufactured by the Altos Hornos de Vizcaya. The track was overhauled for the second time in 1935, although the process would take more than twenty years.

In 1931, the Riotinto railway got a major boost with the arrival of the British engineer George Rice, who was considered an expert in railroads.  Under the direction of Rice, important reforms in the main track and in the factory works (tunnels, bridges) were undertaken during the following years to facilitate the circulation of more powerful locomotives on the track. At the same time, two Garrat locomotives — that RTC had acquired some time before to boost traction — also started operations.

Spanish exploitation 

In 1954, the management and ownership of the railway was transferred to the Compañía Española de Minas de Río Tinto (CEMRT), following the acquisition of the Rio Tinto mines and its facilities by Spanish capitalists. In 1970, management was taken over by the newly created Unión Explosivos Río Tinto (ERT) group.

Due to the large volume of traffic it carried, the Riotinto railway had a large fleet of vehicles and engines, becoming the second largest in Spain after the RENFE. In the mid-1950s it had 120 locomotives, about 3,000 large-capacity freight cars or wagons, and various auxiliary material, such as cranes. In order to introduce new engine material, the RTC had acquired new Mogul type steam locomotives, colloquially known as "Gildas", which arrived in Spain in 1954. Although the use of steam locomotives prevailed for most of the railway's existence, diesel traction would eventually be introduced in an attempt to modernize the fleet. In this sense, the purchase in the 1960s of a Fried-Krupp tractor and several Creusot-type diesel locomotives stood out. To this was added the past acquisition of a series of pantograph electric locomotives for subway operation in the tunnel no. 16 of Naya and in the Filón Norte.

In 1968, the Riotinto railway passenger services were closed, as well as the "workers' trains" that transported employees to their workplaces. This was due to the widespread use of the automobile as a means of private transportation and the loss-making nature of these services for the owner of the railway. A few years later, in 1978, the branches going to Nerva and Zalamea la Real were closed for good.

In 1974, the route between Las Mallas and Huelva was closed to traffic, leaving the infrastructure inactive. From then on, the trains coming from the mines would reach the Las Mallas complex, where the ore would be loaded onto trucks and later transported from there to Huelva — destined for the new facilities of the Chemical park of Huelva. As a result of the new situation, a year later the Odiel river piers stopped operating, and this infrastructure was also abandoned. Starting in 1975, steam locomotives were definitively removed from traction work on the line, a role that was taken over by diesel locomotives. In May 1975 and April 1979, two new Alco model diesel engines were acquired (No. 911 and No. 912), which would give satisfactory results.

Decommissioning and abandonment 
During its final years, the railway traffic experienced such a decline that its exploitation ceased to be economically profitable for the owning company. Although several studies were carried out by Río Tinto Minera in order to keep the railway in service, eventually it did not materialize. The line was closed to traffic in February 1984, after the last regular service had been carried out. On 8 February 1984, a train pulled by locomotive no. 911 ran on a route from Las Mallas to Riotinto, in order to remove empty wagons. After the closure of the line, the facilities were abandoned and underwent uncontrolled dismantling, affecting both the railway tracks and the rolling stock parked in the locomotive depot at Zarandas. Many stations on the line were seriously deteriorated, while the historic facilities of Río Tinto-Estación and Huelva ended up disappearing for the most part after being dismantled. In addition, some sections of the old line were largely dismantled, with the removal of tracks and crossties.

Restoration for tourist use 
Since the late 1980s, several initiatives were carried out to recover the railway infrastructures and stop their deterioration. In this context, the company Río Tinto Minera transferred its historical heritage assets to the Fundación Río Tinto (FRT), an entity created in 1987 that carried out many of these tasks. The railway line became part of the heritage of the FRT. A study was carried out in 1990 on the possibilities of using the mining line for tourist purposes, although it was rejected due to its high cost. A second project, dated 1993, foresaw the rehabilitation of the railway line through several phases. Following these postulates, the recovery of the rolling stock and infrastructure was carried out, which included the restoration of the tracks and the rehabilitation of stations such as Zarandas-Naya or Los Frailes. Since the former Río Tinto-Estación facilities had been dismantled, the rehabilitation of the railway  Since the former Río Tinto-Estación facilities had been dismantled, the rehabilitation of the trackbed began near the former Talleres Mina, erecting a new railway enclosure in order to accommodate visitors and trains.

These operations allowed the partial reopening of the Riotinto railroad in November 1994. A small section between Talleres Mina and Zarandas was initially reopened for service; in February 1997, the operating track was extended to Los Frailes station. From the historical rolling stock that was recovered during those years — including two steam locomotives — the Tourist Mining Train was formed, which offers recreational services along the old railway route. In turn, some locomotives and wagons were taken to be exhibited at the Riotinto Mining Museum.

In total, about eleven kilometers of track were restored to service. A very different scenario applied to the rest of the old railway line. The route between Los Frailes and Manantiales remained untouched; although its recovery was initially planned, over the years it has not happened. The track between Las Mallas and Huelva has been dismantled for the most part, although some stations and bridges have remained unscathed. The track between the stations of Manantiales and Las Mallas has also disappeared. Much of this infrastructure dismantling can be attributed to the action of illegal scrap metal dealers, many of which proliferated after its abandonment during the 1980s. It should also be noted that an old section of the railway has been rehabilitated for cycling and pedestrian use, now called Vía verde de Riotinto, which runs between Zalamea la Real and Minas de Riotinto.

Layout and characteristics 

The Riotinto railway, which used a metric gauge, came to have a main line of more than 80 kilometers in length. Throughout the route, the single track was predominant, although between Río Tinto-Estación and Marín there was a dual track section due to the intense traffic. The main line ran parallel to the course of the Tinto River, with a winding route and an average gradient of 1.176%, although in its last section it ran over a flat and smooth area. In any case, the orographical difficulties of the area led to the construction of up to 8 bridges and 5 tunnels, as well as numerous trenches.

Initially, a dozen stations or sidings were built to regulate the line's traffic, to which new ones would be added later with the construction of the branch lines. Among all of them, the Río Tinto-Estación complex stood out, which constituted an important railway junction where the tracks that went to Nerva and Zalamea la Real converged. The general workshops and a large shunting yard were located in Huelva; the traffic of the entire network was also controlled from this station. Several signal cabins were also built along the route to control switches and signals. Currently, only a section of about 11 kilometers between the stations of Talleres Mina and Los Frailes remains operational, while the main railway facilities of the line are located in the complex of Zarandas-Naya.

Rolling stock 
Riotinto's rolling stock was one of the most important of all Spanish railways in its time. Throughout its history, it employed a total of up to 143 steam locomotives, 9 diesel traction locomotives and as many electric locomotives — the latter destined for subway exploitation in the mines. It had about 1,300 wagons of different types and about 2,000 mine cars for the transport of minerals and goods. The RTC also acquired 36 passenger cars for passenger traffic, as well as some railcars. Since 1987, the Río Tinto Foundation has managed to preserve part of the legacy railway heritage. Nowadays, steam locomotives no. 14 and 51, as well as diesel tractors no. 931, 932, and 933 remain in working order.

See also 

 History of rail transport in Spain

 Rio Tinto Company Limited
 Tourist Mining Train

Notes

References

Bibliography

External links 

Railway lines
Rio Tinto (corporation)
Rio Tinto Iron Ore
Mining
Mining in Spain